Sir Roger Meredith, 5th Baronet (c. 1677 – 31 December 1738) was an English politician who sat in the House of Commons from 1727 to 1734. 
 
Meredith was the son of Sir Richard Meredith, 2nd Baronet and his wife Susanna Skippon, daughter of Philip Skippon of Foulsham Norfolk. He succeeded to the baronetcy on the death of his brother Sir Richard Meredith in 1723.

In 1727, Meredith was elected  Member of Parliament (MP) for Kent and held the seat to 1734.

Meredith lived at Leeds Abbey in Kent. He died in December 1738 and was buried at Leeds church, Kent in January 1739 having a monument erected to his memory.

Meredith married Maria Gott, widow of Samuel Gott and daughter of Francis Tyssen of Shacklewell. They had no children and on his death, the baronetcy became extinct. He devised his estates to his niece Susanna Meredith, daughter of his brother colonel Henry Meredith.

References

1670s births
1738 deaths
British MPs 1727–1734
Members of the Parliament of Great Britain for English constituencies
Baronets in the Baronetage of England
People from Leeds, Kent